Return of the Fly is a 1959 American horror science-fiction film and sequel to The Fly (1958). It is the second installment in The Fly film series. It was released in 1959 as a double feature with The Alligator People. It was directed by Edward Bernds. Unlike the previous film, Return of the Fly was shot in black and white.

Vincent Price was the only returning cast member from the original. It was intended that Herbert Marshall reprise his role as the police inspector, but due to illness he was replaced by John Sutton.

The film was followed by a second sequel, Curse of the Fly (1965).

Plot 
Now an adult, Phillipe Delambre is determined to vindicate his father by successfully completing the experiment he had worked on. His uncle François refuses to help. Phillipe hires Alan Hinds from Delambre Frere and uses his own finances, but the funds run out before the equipment is complete. When Phillipe threatens to sell his half of Delambre Frere, François relents and funds the completion. After some adjustments, they use the transporter to "store" and later re-materialize test animals.

Alan Hinds turns out to be Ronald Holmes, an industrial spy. Holmes tries to sell the secrets to a shadowy cohort named Max. Before Holmes can get away with the papers, a British agent confronts him. Holmes knocks him out and uses the transporter to "store" the body. When rematerialized, the agent has the paws of a guinea pig that had been disintegrated earlier, and the guinea pig has human hands. Holmes kills the rodent and puts the dead agent in his car, which he sends into the Saint Lawrence River.

Phillipe confronts Holmes about all the oddities, with a fight ensuing and Phillipe being knocked out. Holmes hides Phillipe the same way he did the agent, but in a twist of malice he catches a fly and adds it to the transporter with him. François re-materializes Phillipe, but with a giant fly head, arm and leg (whereas the tiny fly has his head, arm and leg). The fly-headed Phillipe runs into the night, tracking down and killing Max. He waits for Holmes to arrive and kills him, too, then returns home, where Inspector Beecham has found and captured the Phillipe-headed fly. Both are placed in the device together and successfully reintegrated, restoring Phillipe to his normal human form.

Cast 

 Vincent Price as François Delambre
 Brett Halsey as Philippe Delambre
 David Frankham as Ronald Holmes / Alan Hinds
 Danielle De Metz as Cecile Bonnard
 John Sutton as Inspector Beecham
 Dan Seymour as Max Barthold
 Jack Daly as Granville
 Janine Grandel as Mme. Bonnard
 Michael Mark as Gaston
 Richard Flato as Sgt. Dubois
 Barry Bernard as Lt. MacLish
 Pat O'Hara as Inspector Evans
 Francisco Villalobos as The Priest
 Florence Strom as The Nun
 Joan Cotton as The Private Duty Nurse
 Ed Wolff as The Fly-Creature

Production 

Kurt Neumann, who directed The Fly, died in 1958 so Robert L. Lippert, who financed the original, had to find a new director. He hired director Edward Bernds and producer Bernard Glasser, who had done Space Master X-7 for Lippert. The budget was more than the normal $125,000 for Lippert productions.

He says that the budget was $275,000 – $25,000 of which went to Vincent Price's fee.

Bernds says his original draft of the film incorporated footage from the first Fly film but they were not allowed to use it. He also said Vincent Price insisted on reading the script before signing on to the film. Once he did, he objected when Bernds cut down on some of his scenes for length.

Filming started on 2 February 1959.

During a particular dialogue scene, actor David Frankham rather conspicuously handles a cane, which closely resembles the wolf-head walking stick famously utilized in Universal's film, The Wolf Man (1941).

The script of the film was written specifically to use the standing sets from The Fly (1958), on the Fox lot in Westwood. The film was finished in March 1959 and released as a double bill with The Alligator People in July.

Release

Home media
Shout! Factory's 2019 Blu-ray release "The Fly Collection" includes all five Fly films plus new audio commentaries. Return of the Fly features a commentary by co-star David Frankham and another by horror film historian Tom Weaver.

Reception

Critical response

Author and film critic Leonard Maltin awarded the film his usual two and a half out of four stars, his most frequently used rating, calling it "[an] adequate sequel to The Fly".

Other media

In popular culture
Horror punk band The Misfits pay tribute to the film with their 1978 song "Return of the Fly".

The original Teenage Mutant Ninja Turtles animated series references the film in a third-season episode by the same name.

References

External links

 
 
 
 

1959 films
1959 horror films
1950s monster movies
1950s science fiction horror films
American black-and-white films
American monster movies
American science fiction horror films
American sequel films
1960s English-language films
Films about shapeshifting
Films directed by Edward Bernds
20th Century Fox films
Mad scientist films
Teleportation in films
The Fly (franchise)
Films scored by Paul Sawtell
1950s English-language films
1950s American films
1960s American films